Babjeviella is a monotypic genus of fungus in the family Debaryomycetaceae. Its sole species is Babjeviella inositovora. It was first described as Pichia inositovora in 1981 by Golubev, Blagod., Suetin & RS Trots. It was revised as Babjeviella inositovora by Kurtzman & M. Suzuki in 2010.

References

Saccharomycetes
Monotypic fungi genera